Weston Tyler Holton (born June 13, 1996) is an American professional baseball pitcher for the Detroit Tigers of Major League Baseball (MLB). He previously played in MLB for the Arizona Diamondbacks.

Career

Amateur career
Holton graduated from Lincoln High School in Tallahassee, Florida, and enrolled at Florida State University to play college baseball for the Florida State Seminoles. In 2016, he played collegiate summer baseball with the Falmouth Commodores of the Cape Cod Baseball League.

The Miami Marlins selected Holton in the 35th round of the 2017 MLB draft, but he did not sign with them. Returning to Florida State in 2018, he tore the ulnar collateral ligament of the elbow and had Tommy John surgery.

Arizona Diamondbacks
The Arizona Diamondbacks selected Holton in the ninth round of the 2018 MLB draft, and he signed with Arizona. He made his professional debut in 2019, appearing in 13 games for the rookie-level AZL Diamondbacks and the Low-A Hillsboro Hops, where he logged a 2.39 ERA across 37.2 innings pitched. Holton did not play in a game in 2020 due to the cancellation of the minor league season because of the COVID-19 pandemic. Holton split the 2021 season between the Double-A Amarillo Sod Poodles and the Triple-A Reno Aces, but struggled to a 6.72 ERA with 78 strikeouts in 64.1 innings pitched across 26 appearances. He was assigned to Triple-A Reno to begin the 2022 season.

On April 28, 2022, the Diamondbacks selected Holton's contract and promoted him to the major leagues for the first time. He made his MLB debut that night, tossing a scoreless inning of relief against the St. Louis Cardinals. He made 10 appearances for Arizona in his rookie campaign, logging a 3.00 ERA with six strikeouts in nine innings pitched.

On February 15, 2023, Holton was designated for assignment by the Diamondbacks following the signing of Andrew Chafin.

Detroit Tigers
On February 17, 2023, Holton was claimed off waivers by the Detroit Tigers.

References

External links

1996 births
Living people
Baseball players from Tallahassee, Florida
Major League Baseball pitchers
Arizona Diamondbacks players
Florida State Seminoles baseball players
Falmouth Commodores players
Arizona League Diamondbacks players
Hillsboro Hops players
Amarillo Sod Poodles players
Reno Aces players